Isak Barosen Strand (born 8 March 1982 in Bergen, Norway), is a Norwegian musician (drums), sound engineering, music producer and composer living in Oslo, known from different musical projects such as electro, techno and crossover stuff such as Moen Meets Me at Sea.

Career
Strand started playing drums at an early age, and attended the "Bergen Kulturskole" (1995–98) under guidance of Terje Isungset and Ivar Kolve among others. In 1998–2001 he went to the Music department at "Langhaugen vgs." in Bergen. Then he joined the Jazz program at Trøndertun folkehøgskole (specialization in audio engineering and midi), and principal instrument drums under guidance of Bjørnar Søreng.

Strand initiated Me At Sea in 2003, as a medium for his creative ideas in sound sampling. He has composed music for this project and another, Mezzophone (from 2001), for about a year before the local club Transformator found interest in his music and invited him for a gig in 2004. Me at Sea appeared on stage for the first time, hammering on beertins, bicycles, stones and grit. The show was met with great interest, and showed a way of presenting electronica for a live audience.

In 2005 Strand started a project with the Norwegian Jazz pianist Øystein Moen. This was a crossover project mixing his synthscape with the acoustic piano. Combining lyrical piano pieces with noise and suggestive drums they found a strange relaxing sound they wanted to go on working with. The band presented a gig at the Ekkofest the same year well received by the audience.

Strand also has regular DJ nights at the rock club Garage in Bergen with the concept *Menn med ærlig arbe'''.

 Discography 

Albums
2005: Moen Meets Me at Sea (Knott Records)
2007: The Last Years of Joy (Knott Records)

EPs
2005: Some Place EP (Knott Records)
2005: Floorkillers Volume 1 (Knott Records)
2005: Floorkillers Volume 2 (Knott records)
2010: Dunk! Dunk! (Knott Records)

As producer and sound engineer
2006: Definition of Ill – The mixtape (Definition of Ill)
2007: Stereo21 – Amazing Space/As We Run Through The Places We Love 7"(Kontrabande Records)
2007: Iris Waves – The non-exclusive EP (Knott Records)
2010: The Soul Express Orchestra – Time for a change (Lill'-Bit Records), with Stig van Eijk
2010: Stereo21 – Stereo21 (Kontrabande Records)
2011: Lovecult – Supersonic (Knott Records)

As sound engineer
2006: Galar – Skogskvad (Heavy Horses Records) 
2008: Sunn O)) – Dømkirke (Southern Lord))) (5 versjioner)
2009: Dbo – Rooms (+3db Records)
2010: Bjørn Hellfuck – Innforjævlig (Universal Music)
2010: Gravdal – Torturmantra (Unexploded Records)
2012: Her Name and Mine – The Oslo Recordings'' (Little Blue Records) including Pernille Koch (vocals) and Fredrik Mikkelsen (guitar)

References

External links 

Forcing Records On Customers – Me at sea (Isak Strand) on YouTube

20th-century Norwegian drummers
21st-century Norwegian drummers
Norwegian percussionists
Norwegian electronic musicians
Norwegian DJs
Norwegian record producers
Norwegian composers
Norwegian male composers
1982 births
Living people
Musicians from Bergen
20th-century drummers
Electronic dance music DJs
20th-century Norwegian male musicians
21st-century Norwegian male musicians